Ben-Wiley Hotel is a historic hotel building located at Fuquay-Varina, Wake County, North Carolina.  It was built in 1925, and is a Bungalow / American Craftsman style frame building consisting of two hip-roofed blocks; the two-story main block with a hip roofed front porch, and a two-story rear block.  It is sheathed in weatherboard and has widely overhanging eaves.  It was converted from 12 hotel rooms to 6 apartments in 1947.

It was listed on the National Register of Historic Places in 1997.

References

Hotel buildings on the National Register of Historic Places in North Carolina
Hotel buildings completed in 1925
Buildings and structures in Wake County, North Carolina
National Register of Historic Places in Wake County, North Carolina